The Scottish Athletics Hall of Fame, launched in 2005, is a perpetual list to honour Scottish athletes of outstanding achievement in the sport of Athletics. In 2005, inductees were selected by a combination of a panel of experts and an online poll. A Nominations Committee was put together with a focus on identifying worthy recipients for a significantly increased list of inductees in 2018. In the case of the posthumous awards Scottish Athletics contact family relatives to inform them of the induction process.

History 

The Scottish Athletics Hall of Fame was launched at the Scottish Track and Field Championships in August 2005. The inaugural inductees were Allan Wells and Eric Liddell.  Liz McColgan and Wyndham Halswelle were inducted the following year. Yvonne Murray in 2007, and Tom McKean in 2008 both followed. Jim Alder was the seventh (and last athlete until 2018) to be inducted at the annual awards dinners on 31 October 2009.

After nine years, in October 2018, another fifteen athletes were announced to be inducted into the Hall of Fame. The 2018 induction happened at the organisation's awards dinner on 3 November. at the Hilton hotel in Glasgow. Lee McConnell was one of the fifteen inductees in 2018 but was unable to attend the ceremony in person. Allan Wells, inducted in 2005, helped with the presentations for his fellow inductees at the 2018 ceremony.

Hall of Fame Inductees

References

External links 
 scottishathletics HALL OF FAME Booklet Scottish Athletics.
 scottishathletics HALL OF FAME 2 Booklet Scottish Athletics.

Athletics
Hall of Fame
Athletics in Scotland
Athletics
Athletics
Awards established in 2005
2005 establishments in Scotland